The 2009 West Coast Conference men's basketball tournament took place March 6–9, 2009, at Orleans Arena in Paradise, Nevada, just outside Las Vegas. This was the first WCC tournament to have been held at a neutral site; it previously rotated between various campus sites. The semifinals were televised by ESPN2, and the championship game was televised by ESPN.

Gonzaga capped off a perfect season in conference play by winning the tournament. The Bulldogs' trip to the 2009 NCAA tournament was their 11th in a row.

2009 West Coast Conference tournament

Asterisk denotes game ended in overtime.

External links
2009 WCC Tournament

West Coast Conference men's basketball tournament
Tournament
West Coast Athletic Conference men's basketball tournament
West Coast Athletic Conference men's basketball tournament
Basketball competitions in the Las Vegas Valley
College basketball tournaments in Nevada
College sports tournaments in Nevada